Off the Wall is a 1981 Canadian documentary film directed by Derek May and funded and produced by National Film Board of Canada. The film is an anthology of the Toronto art scene, circa 1980–1. Subjects in the film include art dealer and gallery owner Jack Pollack, artist Mendelson Joe and the art collective General Idea.

References

External links
Watch Off the Wall at NFB.ca

1981 films
1981 documentary films
Documentary films about Toronto
Documentary films about the visual arts
National Film Board of Canada documentaries
Films produced by Tom Daly
Films directed by Derek May
1980s Canadian films